Jason Ringenberg (born November 22, 1958) is an American musician, singer-songwriter and guitarist and the lead singer of Jason & the Scorchers.

Early life and education 
Ringenberg was born in Kewanee, Illinois, and grew up in nearby Sheffield, Illinois, where his parents owned a family hog farm that bordered the Rock Island Railroad line. He started playing in rock, alternative rock, and country-bands while in school at Southern Illinois University Carbondale.

Career 
In 1981, Ringenberg moved to Nashville, Tennessee, where he soon formed Jason & the Scorchers with Warner Hodges, Jeff Johnson, and Perry Baggs. Their potent mix of punk rock and country gained them fans around the world. In the words of Rolling Stone they "singlehandedly re-wrote the history of rock'n'roll in the South". They won critical approval with the release of successful albums and energetic live performances.

Jason & the Scorchers had several hits, including "Golden Ball and Chain" and a rock version of Bob Dylan's "Absolutely Sweet Marie."

Ringenberg was influential in the early to mid 1980s when the indie country/rock movement was at its height. His music, along with similar bands, founded the emergence of the alternative country and Americana genres within indie rock music.

In 2008, Jason & the Scorchers received the Americana Music Association's Lifetime Achievement Award in the Performance Category.

Ringenberg has also seen success as a solo artist. He has released five solo records and toured as a solo artist. The Times (London) called him "one of the most exciting performers of his generation." He now performs both solo as Jason Ringenberg and as his children's music character, Farmer Jason, often performing as both personas in the same day.

Ringenberg created his children's music character, Farmer Jason, in 2002 to entertain his own daughters. He then released his first children's record on the Yep Roc Records label; A Day at the Farm with Farmer Jason, in 2003. The character remains popular and has become the most successful project of his career. As Farmer Jason, he sings songs about farm animals and the appreciation of nature. His PBS mini program called "It's a Farmer Jason" has earned four Emmy nominations and one Emmy win. He has recorded four records and a DVD as Farmer Jason. The fourth album, Christmas on the Farm with Farmer Jason, was released in December 2014.

His album Stand Tall (2019) was written while he was Artist in Residence at Sequoia National Park. Recorded at his old college haunts in Southern Illinois and also in Nashville, the subjects of the songs range from John the Baptist to The Ramones to a disillusioned Confederate draftee.

Personal life
Ringenberg lives near Bon Aqua, Tennessee, with his wife Suzy; daughters Kelsey, Addie, and Camille; and a barnyard full of animals.

Discography

Jason & The Scorchers
 Reckless Country Soul (Praxis, 1982). EP
 Fervor (Praxis, 1983), rereleased in 1984 for EMI.
 Lost & Found (EMI, 1986).
 Still Standing (EMI, 1986).
 Thunder and Fire (A&M, 1989).
 Are You Ready for the Country: The Essential Jason & The Scorchers. Volume One (EMI, 1992)
 A Blazing Grace (Mammoth, 1995).
 Clear Impetuous Morning (Mammoth, 1996).
 Both Sides of The Line (EMI, 1996)
 Midnight Roads and Stages Seen (Mammoth, 1998)
 Rock on Germany (Courageous Chicken Music, 2001)
 Wildfires & Misfires: Two Decades of Outtakes and Rarities (Courageous Chicken, 2002).
 Halcyon Times (Courageous Chicken, 2010).

Solo
 One Foot in The Honky Tonk (Liberty, 1992)
 A Pocketful of Soul (2000)
 All Over Creation (2002)
 Empire Builders (2004)
 Best Tracks and Side Tracks (2008)
 Stand Tall (2019)
 Rhinestoned (2021)

As Farmer Jason
 A Day at the Farm With Farmer Jason (2003)
 Rockin' In The Forest With Farmer Jason (2006)
 Nature Jams (2012)
 Christmas on the Farm with Farmer Jason (2014)

References

External links 

 
 

1958 births
Living people
People from Kewanee, Illinois
American country rock singers
American rock guitarists
American male guitarists
American male singer-songwriters
American rock singers
American rock songwriters
American children's musicians
American alternative country musicians
Southern Illinois University Carbondale alumni
Singer-songwriters from Illinois
Guitarists from Illinois
20th-century American guitarists
Country musicians from Illinois
20th-century American male musicians